Ton Blanker (born 15 September 1960) is a Dutch former professional football player.

Career
Blanker started his career with Ajax winning the 1979–80 Eredivisie, and reaching the Semi-finals in the 1979–80 European Cup, where he scored four goals against HJK Helsinki in the first round, then a hat-trick against Omonia in the next round.

Afterwards, Blanker played abroad for Vitória de Guimarães, Real Zaragoza and Salamanca, then he eventually returned to Eredivisie to play for S.B.V. Excelsior and FC Volendam.

After a short spell in the United States with Los Angeles Lazers, Blanker played two years in Belgium for Germinal Beerschot and Cappellen.

Personal life
Blanker is married to Anita Heilker of the Dolly Dots, they had a daughter, Robin.

References

1960 births
Living people
Dutch footballers
Eredivisie players
AFC Ajax players
Vitória S.C. players
Real Zaragoza players
UD Salamanca players
Excelsior Rotterdam players
FC Volendam players
Los Angeles Lazers players
Beerschot A.C. players
Royal Cappellen F.C. players
Footballers from Amsterdam
Association football midfielders